National Democratic Alliance is an Indian political party coalition led by Bharatiya Janata Party.
For the 1999 Indian general election, the NDA's candidates for the Lok Sabha constituencies are as follows.

Lok Sabha 1999 general election

Andhra Pradesh

Arunachal Pradesh

Assam

Bihar

Goa

Gujarat

Haryana

Himachal Pradesh

Jammu and Kashmir

Karnataka

Kerala

Madhya Pradesh

Maharashtra

Manipur

Meghalaya

Mizoram

Nagaland

Orissa

Punjab

Rajasthan

Sikkim

Tamil Nadu

Tripura

Uttar Pradesh

West Bengal

Constituencies by Union territory

Andaman and Nicobar Islands

Chandigarh

Dadra and Nagar Haveli

Daman and Diu

Lakshadweep

NCT of Delhi

Pondicherry

References 

Lists of political candidates
1999 Indian general election